Lydgate is a community in the Municipality of the District of Shelburne, Nova Scotia, Canada. It is on Nova Scotia Trunk 3, and about 4 km from Lockeport. It borders on to Green Harbour bay.

References

Communities in Shelburne County, Nova Scotia